Bazhenovo is a rural locality (a selo) and the administrative centre of Bazhenovsky Selsoviet, Belebeyevsky District, Bashkortostan, Russia. The population was 1,120 as of 2010. There are 25 streets.

Geography 
Bazhenovo is located 24 km southwest of Belebey (the district's administrative centre) by road. Yekaterinovka is the nearest rural locality.

References 

Rural localities in Belebeyevsky District